Louise Bagnall is an Irish filmmaker and animator who works as a creative director with Cartoon Saloon in Kilkenny.

Career
Bagnall wrote and directed the 2019 Oscar-nominated Late Afternoon.
Bagnall from Dublin, studied at the National Film School at the Dún Laoghaire Institute of Art, Design and Technology gaining a degree in Animation. She also worked as a character designer on the oscar-nominated The Breadwinner.

Other short animated films Louise has directed include Cúl An Tí, Loose Ends and Donkey.

See also
Tomm Moore
Nora Twomey
Cinema of Ireland

References

Living people
Cartoon Saloon people
Irish animators
Irish animated film directors
Irish film directors
Alumni of IADT
Irish women animators
Year of birth missing (living people)